Carbon neutral might refer to:

Carbon neutrality, a balancing greenhouse gas emissions with renewable energy
The Presbyterian Church (USA) Carbon Neutral Resolution
Zero-carbon building, carbon neutral buildings
Carbon neutral fuel or carbon negative fuel

Carbon offsetting
Carbon offsetting to reduce carbon dioxide gas emissions
The carboNZero programme, a measurement, reduction and offset programme administered by Landcare Research